Förderstedt is a village and a former municipality in the district of Salzlandkreis, in Saxony-Anhalt, Germany. Since 1 January 2009, it is part of the town Staßfurt.

Former municipalities in Saxony-Anhalt
Salzlandkreis